Baron Seymour of Trowbridge was a title in the Peerage of England. It was created on 19 February 1641 for Francis Seymour, a younger son of Edward Seymour, Lord Beauchamp, for his support of Charles I in Parliament. It became a subsidiary title of the Duke of Somerset in 1675, and became extinct on the death of Algernon Seymour, 7th Duke of Somerset in 1750. The dukedom reverted to the elder line, the 6th baronet of Berry Pomeroy becoming 8th duke of Somerset.

Barons Seymour of Trowbridge (1641)
Francis Seymour, 1st Baron Seymour of Trowbridge (c.1590–1664)
Charles Seymour, 2nd Baron Seymour of Trowbridge (c.1621–1665)
Francis Seymour, 5th Duke of Somerset and 3rd Baron Seymour of Trowbridge (1658–1678)

For further holders, see Duke of Somerset until 1750.

Family tree

References 

 

 
1641 establishments in England
1750 disestablishments in England
Noble titles created in 1641
!